Largo Winch is a television program based on the Belgian comic book series of the same name by Philippe Francq and Jean Van Hamme that first aired on January 26, 2001 in France on M6, and May 3, 2001 in Germany on ProSieben. The show lasted two seasons. Guest stars included Kim Poirier, Vernon Dobtcheff, Elisha Cuthbert, Olga Kurylenko and David Carradine.

Plot
Largo Winch (Paolo Seganti) is a 28-year-old adventurer, drifting around the world, searching for himself. Along the way he's picked up with Simon Ovrannaz (Diego Wallraff), an ex-thief he met in a Turkish prison. The two are best friends...almost brothers.

Then one day, Largo's life is changed forever when he learns that Nerio Winch (David Carradine), the step-father he barely knew, is dead. Nerio is an Aristotle Onassis-like billionaire who secretly adopted Largo as a child, but never took him in. Instead, he paid a family in Luxembourg to raise him, then sent him to a monastery as a teenager to be educated. Nerio paid the bills, and that was pretty much the extent of their relationship. These last few years, they barely saw each other.

Now Nerio has committed suicide because he was dying of a brain tumor...and, incredibly, has left his vast fortune and control of Group W, his multi-national corporate empire, to Largo. Largo is overwhelmed by the responsibility of this sudden inheritance. The board of directors at Group W despise him, thinking him unworthy and incompetent.

Then Largo receives an astonishing video recorded by his step-father just before his death. On it, Nerio reveals that he was once a member of a mysterious organization called The Adriatic Commission, a secret conspiracy of billionaires and politicians who work to control the economic and political destiny of the world for their own ends. For years they have tried to kill Nerio for leaving. In the video Nerio says that if he is dead, despite what the official cause of death may be, it is because they have finally succeeded. Nerio ends by charging Largo with using Group W to seek out and destroy The Commission and uncover the names of its secret members.

Eventually Largo discovers another bit of amazing information. Nerio was not his step-father at all, but his biological parent. He kept Largo's existence a secret to protect him from The Commission, which would have surely used the son against the father.

And so Largo faces a series of enormous challenges. He must learn to run one of the world's biggest corporations, all the while being opposed and undermined at every turn by his own board of directors. They are led by Michel Cardignac (Charles Powell), a charming, scheming, ruthless executive who will do whatever he can to see Largo ousted and himself at the head of Group W.

Largo must also follow his father's wishes and try to expose and destroy The Adriatic Commission. And since The Commission is determined to gain control of Group W, they are always shadowing him, always waiting for an opportunity to pounce and destroy him.

But Largo is an adventurer at heart, not a businessman. And so, at every opportunity, he bolts the boardroom and sets off in search of excitement. But he doesn't go alone. He's assisted by Joy Arden (Sydney Penny), a beautiful ex-CIA agent who used to work for Group W's security under Nerio, and Georgi Kerensky (Geordie Johnson), a former KGB agent who left Russia after the fall of the Soviet Union.

His biggest ally inside Group W is John Sullivan (Serge Houde), head of the Group W legal department and a member of the board of directors. He was Nerio's best friend, and swore to do all he could to help Largo navigate the treacherous waters of Nerio's empire.

Cast
 Paolo Seganti as Largo Winch
 Sydney Penny as Joy Arden
 Diego Wallraff as Simon Ovronnaz
 Serge Houde as John Sullivan
 Geordie Johnson as Georgy Kerensky
 Tyrone Benskin as Waldo Buzetti
 Sonia Benezra as Alicia Del Ferill
 Charles Powell as Michel Cardignac
 Victoria Sanchez as Vanessa Ovronnaz
 Michelle Lipper as Marissa Green
 Agathe De La Boulaye as Diana Murray
 Lucie Jeanne as Danielle Haddad

Guest
 Babsie Steger as Anna Faubert (Season 1, Episode 14)

Episodes

Season 1 
 The Heir (part one) (Pilot)
 The Heir (part two) (Pilot)
 Legacy
 Just Cause
 Sins of the Father
 Revenge
 Arctic Project
 AKA: Vanessa
 Blind Eye
 Queen of Hearts
 Sylvia
 Nuclear Family
 Contessa Vanessa
 Briefcase
 Endgame
 Redemption
 Cheap Thrills
 Blast from the Past
 Dear Abby
 Forget Me Not
 Flashback
 Court of Last Resort
 The Hunted
 Business as Usual
 See You in Court
 Revelations

Season 2 
 Bloodlines
 A Breed Apart
 Love Hurts
 Cold Hearted
 Skin Deep
 Psycho Killer
 Scent of Suspicion
 Killer Cardignac
 Hot Property
 Rest and Relaxation
 Down on the Pharm
 Errors of Commission
 Time in a Bottle

External links 
 
 TV Section of the LargoWinch.net Wiki
 Forums dedicated to Largo Winch  

2001 French television series debuts
2001 French television series endings
2001 German television series debuts
2001 German television series endings
2000s Canadian drama television series
2001 Canadian television series debuts
2001 Canadian television series endings
2001 American television series debuts
2001 American television series endings
French action television series
Television shows filmed in Montreal
Television series by CBS Studios
Adaptations of works by Jean Van Hamme
Television series based on Belgian comics
Television series by Muse Entertainment
ProSieben original programming